Mixpanel is a business analytics service company. It tracks user interactions with web and mobile applications and provides tools for targeted communication with them.

Data collected is used to build custom reports and measure user engagement and retention. Mixpanel works with web applications, in particular SaaS, but also supports mobile apps.

History
Mixpanel was founded by Suhail Doshi and Tim Trefren in 2009 and is based in San Francisco, California. It is backed by Y Combinator, and its list of investors includes Andreessen Horowitz, Max Levchin and Keith Rabois.

In April 2018, founder and CEO Suhail Doshi announced he would step down and become chairman of the board. He was replaced as CEO by Amir Movafaghi.

Mixpanel's second funding round happened in December 2014, a Series B round led by Andreessen Horowitz, with $65M raised at a pre-money valuation of $800M.

Mixpanel's most recent funding round happened in November 2021, raised a Series C round, a $200 million investment on a $1.05 billion valuation from Bain Capital Tech Opportunities.

References

General references

External links
 

Business intelligence companies
Analytics
Companies based in San Francisco